Caroline Woodcock (born 1973), is a female former swimmer who competed for England.

Swimming career
Woodcock became a National champion after winning the 1989 ASA National Championship in the 50 metres freestyle and successfully defended her title the following year. She represented England in the 50 metres freestyle, at the 1990 Commonwealth Games in Auckland, New Zealand.

References

1973 births
English female swimmers
Swimmers at the 1990 Commonwealth Games
Living people
English female freestyle swimmers
Commonwealth Games competitors for England